Street football, also known as backyard football or sandlot football, is an amateur variant of American football primarily played informally by youth. It features far less equipment and fewer rules than its counterparts and, unlike the similar touch football, features full tackling.

Main rules 

An organized version has seven players to a side, such as in the American 7's Football league (A7FL); however, such organization is rare, players per side can range from as few as one ("one on one" football) playing both sides of the ball to dozens. Games are played on fields generally ranging from as short as 10 to as large as 50 yards, with the occasional game being played on a full-size regulation 100 yard field such as in the A7FL. Generally, the larger the field, the more players that can be incorporated into the game.  The A7FL plays on a full-size regulation field in regards to length, however, the width of the field is shortened, from approximately 50 yards, to 40 yards in order to accommodate fewer players on the field. Teams are typically assembled from scratch.

Most forms of backyard or street football use ad hoc house rules that vary from neighborhood to neighborhood.

The two teams organize on opposite sides of the field for the kickoff. Because of skill, field size and other issues, this is usually not a kickoff but rather a punt-off or a throw-off. Many versions skip this process and start the offense at a certain point, similar to a touchback in other national leagues.

As in regular American football, each team usually has four downs per series. In order to achieve a series of downs, backyard football requires the team with the ball to complete two passes or reach a certain point on the field. Few games include enough people, or the proper equipment, to run a chain crew to maintain the 10 yard familiar in most organized leagues. These structures encourages passing plays over running, as does the usual lack of offensive and defensive lines. The use of a center is optional, depending on the rules set forth, and other ways to start the play (e.g. the quarterback picking up the ball directly, or holding the ball out prior to starting play, then pulling it back to begin) are often used in lieu of a snap. Play continues until there is a turnover on downs (i.e. the offensive team fails to complete two passes in four downs), an interception occurs, or the team on offense scores a touchdown. Touchdowns are worth 6, 7, or 1 point(s) depending on the rules set out before the game. In some instances, depending on the width of the field more downs are used or teams are given a certain number of downs to score in as opposed to 4 tries to get a first down. For instance, a team might be given 8 tries to score and advance the ball from where they receive the ball or establish position. Also the length of a first down may differ due to the lack of a pass rush. For instance, a team may have to advance fifteen or twenty yards to get a first down in 4 tries.

Field goals and extra point kicks are nonexistent (streets and backyards have no goal posts), although punts can frequently happen, usually during "4th and 2 completions" situations where the offensive team cannot earn a first down. (In games played on regulation fields, these kicks can be attempted, but only in certain scoring systems.)

In the event a touchdown is scored, the team on offense will normally stay in the end zone in which they had just scored and the other team will go into the main field and field the subsequent kickoff. This rule is some times known as "losers walk". Thus, until an interception or turnover on downs, both teams defend and attempt to score on the same end zone.

Rules greatly vary from neighborhood to neighborhood and are customarily set before each game. There can be a rush on the QB depending on the rules set out before the game. Usually if rushes are allowed, there are 2 rules that are commonly applied: call rush and blitz count. Call rush is the first rule of rushing the QB in street. This is where the defense calls "Blitz" in a loud voice before the offense hikes the ball, signifying that they will rush, but there is also a counter effect with this. The QB can get out of the pocket and run without having to pass or hand off the ball, also the quarterback can call "shotgun" before or after the other team says "blitz" causing the opposite to have to count to 5 or 10 depending on whether or not they called blitz 5 calling "shotgun" adds 5 seconds to the blitz count.  The second, and more common, rush QB rule is Mississippi rush (a blitz count), so called because the blitzing player must insert the word "Mississippi" between numbers so as not to allow the player to count ridiculously fast and effectively give the quarterback no time to throw (A common alternate to "Mississippi" is "apple". The word "Banana" is typically used by NAFs. In Canada the word "steamboat" is generally used instead of Mississippi).  Sometimes the two rules are combined, allowing one separate call of "Blitz!" per set of 4 downs.  The other option to handle a rush is to use an offensive lineman or center to block any pass rush. A line is rare in street, and the act of a center snapping to a quarterback is completely optional and nearly impossible in 2 on 2. When a center is used, the center is eligible as a receiver. Also the center sneak, wherein the center snaps the ball touching the QB hands but retaining possession and then running is completely legal and honorable in sandlot ball. Most teams that use a line opt for 3 down linemen(1 center and 2 guards). Some organizations that don't require the center to snap the ball to the quarterback only use 2 linemen. Popular plays include going long, the hook, the hook and go, and the down and out. A well practiced pump fake by the QB often accompanies the hook and go.

Conversions after a TD usually are not applied and they can only be attempted from the 6 (or occasionally 7) point TD system, but if they are, there are several conversion systems, including "single point," "pass-run," yardage and "runback." The single-point is the simplest of the rules, in which any successful conversion is worth one point. Pass run is used in some midget leagues and awards 2 points for a pass and one point for a run. Usually all pass-run conversions are attempted from the 1- or 2-yard line. The second conversion system is the yardage system, similar to that used in the XFL playoffs, the Lingerie Football League, and the Stars Football League. The yardage system is formatted like this: 1-point conversions are attempted from the 1- or 5-yard line, and 2-point conversions are attempted from the 2- or 10-yard line. The runback is the most rare of the conversion rules, and is most often implemented in one-on-one games. In this version, the play does not end once the ball crosses the goal line; instead, the player with the ball must change direction and advance it all the way back to the other end zone for two points.

The game ends when a pre-determined number of touchdowns or points has been scored, or an arbitrary time is reached (for instance, dusk or the start of school).

Penalties are rare and are usually only enforced in the most egregious cases, such as serious injuries or blatant pass interference. Most games use the honor system in lieu of a referee and/or an officiating crew.

Leagues 

Organized sandlot football has been around since as early as 1908; in that year, a circuit was launched in Rochester, New York after the city banned high school football in its schools. The circuit produced a team known as the Rochester Jeffersons, who later joined the National Football League as a charter member in 1920, as well as several other teams that lasted into the 1930s.

Street football is usually played as a pick-up game and has very little organization.

In video games 

Street football has been used as the basis for two very different video games. EA Sports's NFL Street is a rules-light version of football played by NFL stars, similar to the Blitz series created by Midway Games. Atari's Backyard Football series, on the other hand, is a more kid-friendly game with players including child versions of NFL stars.

References 

Variations of American football